Dance Alone is a five-song EP released by Logan Lynn on May 7, 2013 on his label, Logan Lynn Music.

Remixes
In the spring of 2013, Logan Lynn held a public remix contest for his single "Hologram" and on May 7, 2013 he released a second 5-song remix EP called Dance Alone, which featured the winners.  The EP was produced by Logan Lynn and was released on his label, Logan Lynn Music.

Track listing

References

External links

2013 EPs
Logan Lynn albums